Blean is a village and civil parish in the Canterbury district of Kent, England. The civil parish  is large and is mostly woodland, much of which is ancient woodland. The developed village within the parish is scattered along the road between Canterbury and Whitstable, in the middle of the Forest of Blean. The parish of St. Cosmus and St. Damian in the Blean was renamed "Blean" on 1 April 2019.

History
According to Edward Hasted's 1800 county study, the village was once part of the king's ancient forest of Blean in the hundred of Westgate.

The name Blean is the dative form of the Old English word ‘blea’ which means rough ground. Therefore the name of the parish means "the church of Saints Cosmas and Damian (sic) in the rough ground."

In 1835, the Blean Union Workhouse, designed by William Edmunds, was built on four acres south of Herne Common. The design was based on  Sir Francis Bond Head's Plan of a Rural Workhouse for 500 Persons, a publication of the Poor Law Commission. To keep costs down, no outside drains were added, and the building was windowless. Discipline was severe. A nine-year-old girl was once punished for a small offence by being forced to remain overnight in the mortuary with a corpse; however, the Master and Matron were dismissed as a result.

Amenities
The village has a druid woodland sculpture park, noted for its large sleeping dragon.  The east of the village has a hall and recreation ground used for sports.

The parish church is about half a mile from the village centre. It is dedicated to St Cosmus and St Damian and emphasising some kind of descriptor of the land itself, has always been suffixed 'in the Blean'. It is a 13th-century building and Grade II* listed, the second highest designation in the national grading scheme.

The village contains: two pubs; a cafe; an angling store; corner store.

Governance
Blean is part of the electoral ward of Blean Forest. The population of this ward at the 2011 census was 6,176.

Economy
Blean's economy is closely tied to Canterbury and to a lesser extent, Whitstable.  In television entertainment Smallfilms operates here the production company that created the animated series Ivor the Engine, Bagpuss and the Clangers, at Peter Firmin's barn on the Blean farm. The bay window of Firmin's house was featured in the opening sequence of Bagpuss.

Eponyms
The Hunt-class destroyer HMS Blean was named after the village's Blean Beagles hunt.

References

External links
Parish Church of St Cosmus & St Damian in the Blean

Villages in Kent
Civil parishes in Kent
City of Canterbury